Manoir de la Vermondie is a château in Dordogne, Nouvelle-Aquitaine, France. It became a Historic Monument in 1948.

As of 2014, it was on sale for c£5M.

References

Châteaux in Dordogne
Monuments historiques of Dordogne